John Sweeney is a Detective Superintendent in the Metropolitan Police Service. As of 2011, he is leading Operation Withern, the investigation into the 2011 London riots.

He had previously led the reinvestigation of the murder of policeman Keith Blakelock.

References

Living people
Year of birth missing (living people)
Metropolitan Police officers
British people of Irish descent